Lynmore James (born August 28, 1937) is an American politician who served in the Georgia House of Representatives from 1993 to 2013.

References

1937 births
Living people
Democratic Party members of the Georgia House of Representatives
20th-century American politicians
21st-century American politicians